Anabas is a genus of climbing gouramies native to southern and eastern Asia. They inhabit both brackish and fresh water. Anabas species possess a labyrinth organ, a structure in the fish's head which allows it to breathe atmospheric oxygen, so it can be out of water for an extended period of time (6–8 hr), hence its name from the Greek anabainein ‘walk up’, from ana- ‘up’ + bainein ‘go’. They are carnivorous, living on a diet of water invertebrates and their larvae, and - in contrast to most of their relatives - are scatter spawners with no parental care. Species are found in South Asia, including India, Sri Lanka, Bangladesh, Burma, Indonesia, Malaysia, Thailand, Cambodia, and the Philippines.

Species
There are two recognized species in the genus Anabas:
 Anabas cobojius (F. Hamilton, 1822) (Gangetic koi)
 Anabas testudineus (Bloch, 1792) (climbing perch)

References

 
Anabantidae
Freshwater fish genera
 
 
Taxa named by Hippolyte Cloquet